On 8 August 2008, at approximately 10:30 local time (8:30 UTC), EuroCity train EC 108 Comenius, en route from Kraków, Poland, to Prague, Czech Republic, struck a part of a motorway bridge that had fallen onto the railroad track near the Studénka railway station in the Czech Republic. The train derailed, killing eight people and injuring 64.

Crash 
The motorway bridge near Studénka railroad station was undergoing repairs that were to last until September 2008. On 8 August the workers were putting a beam to span between the two supports on the sides of the railroad track. The driver noticed the iron bridge structure swaying and immediately engaged the emergency brake and escaped from the control cab to the engine room, which is much better protected against impact. This behaviour was later recognized by the Czech Railways inspectors as exactly what drivers should do in this kind of situation. It was said that there is a very high probability that this conduct saved his life.

The locomotive and four carriages derailed after the impact; the carriage coupled directly behind the locomotive sustained the most damage. Six other carriages, among them the restaurant carriage, remained on the track. Three freight vans on another track were also derailed.
At the time of the accident, there were approximately 400 people on board the train, 105 of them of Polish nationality. There was also a group of people travelling to an Iron Maiden concert in Prague.

Rescue operation 

Since the accident happened during the day and there were people present in the proximity of the track, the rescue units were notified about the situation almost instantly. The first rescue unit, which consisted of firefighters stationed in Studénka, arrived at the accident site only seven minutes after the alarm was issued. There were a total of 20 firefighter rescue units (altogether 100 firefighters and 40 firefighter engines) rescuing the passengers. Twenty ambulances together with helicopters transported the injured into all the nearest hospitals in Ostrava, Nový Jičín, Frýdek-Místek, Opava, Bílovec, Olomouc and Valašské Meziříčí. Thanks to cooperation within the Integrated rescue system (Integrovaný záchranný systém), all the injured were in the hospitals within two hours of the accident. Polish authorities offered help with the rescue operation immediately when notified about the disaster, but the offer was not accepted as Czech rescue services did not consider it necessary.

Criticism 
Immediately after the accident there was a great public uproar about finding the culprits. First accused was the Czech Railways company for letting trains travel at relatively high speeds in the construction area. However, the Czech Railways spokesman stated that the building company had not notified the Czech Railways about the ongoing reconstruction of the bridge.
The building company Dopravní stavby Ostrava was also accused of being responsible for the accident. The spokesman for the company stated that the causes of the falling bridge parts onto the track were being investigated and that all the compulsory notifications to the Czech Railways about the reconstruction of the bridge had definitely been issued.

Aftermath 
Two Czech men, three Czech women and a Polish woman were killed in the crash, while the seventh victim, a young Ukrainian man, died later in hospital. The eighth fatality, a 21-year-old Polish woman, died two months after the disaster on 26 September.

The cost of the damage was estimated at 136 million CZK (5.6 million Euros, 8.4 million US dollars), according to a Czech Rail Safety Inspection Office announcement.
The Czech Railways company promised to pay compensation to everyone injured as well as to families of the dead. The amount of money paid would then vary depending on individual circumstances of every case.

See also 
 2015 Studénka train crash

References

External links

 Seven dead in Czech train crash
 Seven dead in Czech crash
 Iht.com

August 2008 events in Europe
Railway accidents in 2008
2008 in the Czech Republic
Derailments in the Czech Republic
Nový Jičín District
Bridge disasters caused by construction error
2008 disasters in the Czech Republic